The following elephants or elephant-like figures occur in mythology and religion:

 Airavata, an elephant ridden by the Hindu god Indra.
 Erawan, the Thai version of Airavata.
 Ganesh, an elephant-headed Hindu deity.
 Malini, an elephant-headed goddess associated with the birth of Ganesha.
 Girimekhala, the elephant that carries Mara in Theravada Buddhism.
 Vinayaki, an elephant-headed Hindu goddess.
 Kasogonagá, a Toba deity described as either an elephant or an anteater.
An elephant god doubtlessly existed in the predynastic period of ancient Egypt, as indicated from the statuette of a man with the head of an elephant, which was discovered by Jean Vercoutter in a temple in Sudan, Wad ban Naqa. In 1970, during the German expedition of Musawwarat es-Sufra at Sudan, there was also discovered a graffito on the eastern outside wall of the Temple of Mut, which appears to be an elephant-headed figure wearing a sun disk.

See also 
Gaja, elephants in Hindu mythology
List of fictional elephants
List of historical elephants
List of legendary creatures

References

 
E
Lists of elephants